Calocochlea pulcherrima  is a species of large air-breathing land snail, a pulmonate gastropod mollusk in the family Camaenidae.  

This species is very common in the Philippines. The shell is between 31 and 46 millimeters long with brown spiral bands and a cream-colored background.

References

 Pfeiffer, L. (1842). Descriptions of new species of shells belonging to the genera Helix and Bulimus, collected by H. Cuming, Esq, in the Philippine Islands. Proceedings of the zoological Society of London. 10 (113): 84–89. London
ABBOTT, R.T., 1989: Compendium of landshells: a colour guide to more than 2,000 of the World's Terrestrial Shells. American Malacologists Inc., Burlington, USA.

External links
  Sowerby, G. B., I. (1841). Descriptions of new species of the family Helicidae, collected by Mr. H. Cuming in the Philippine Islands. Proceedings of the Zoological Society of London. 8: 87-91, 96-104, 116-118
 Reeve L.A. (1841-1842). Conchologia Systematica, or complete system of conchology; in which the Lepades and conchiferous Mollusca are described and classified according to their natural organization and habits. Longman, Brown, Green, & Longman's, London. Vol. 1: 1-195, pls 1-129; Vol. 2: 1-338, pls 130-300
 Richardson, L. (1983). Bradybaenidae: Catalog of species. Tryonia. 9: 1-253
 Quadras, J. F. & Möllendorf, O. F. von. (1893). Diagnoses specierum novarum ex parte septentrionali insulae Luzon. Nachrichtsblatt der Deutschen Malakozoologischen Gesellschaft. 25(11-12): 169 - 184
Biolib
Zipcodezoo
Discover Life

Camaenidae
Gastropods described in 1841